Housing Act is a common title of Acts of national legislatures in many common law countries, and may refer to:

Canada
National Housing Act (Canada)

United Kingdom
The Housing Act is a stock title used for Acts of Parliament in the United Kingdom relating to housing. The following Acts of Parliament are Housing Acts passed in the United Kingdom:

Housing Act 1930, (also known as the Greenwood Act)
Housing Act 1933
Housing Act 1935

Housing Act 1969
Housing Act 1980
Housing Act 1985
Housing Act 1988
Housing Act 1996
Housing Act 2004

The term Housing Act is occasionally also used to refer to housing-related United Kingdom public health legislation:
Housing of the Working Classes Act 1885
Housing of the Working Classes Act 1890
Housing of the Working Classes Act 1900

Housing and Planning Act may refer to: 

Housing and Planning Act 1986
Housing and Planning Act 2016

United States
Housing Act of 1937
Housing Act of 1949
Housing Act of 1954
National Housing Act of 1934
Fair Housing Act (enacted as Title VIII of the Civil Rights Act of 1968)
Housing and Community Development Act of 1974
Housing and Community Development Act of 1987
Housing and Economic Recovery Act of 2008
Housing and Urban Development Act of 1965
Housing and Urban Development Act of 1968
Housing and Urban Development Act of 1970
Housing for Older Persons Act, 1995

See also
Housing and Community Development Act (disambiguation)